Processed World is an anti-capitalist, anti-authoritarian magazine focused on the oppressions and absurdities of office work, which, at the time the magazine began, was becoming automated. The magazine was founded by Chris Carlsson, Caitlin Manning, and Adam Cornford in 1981. No new issues have been produced since 2005.

The print magazine was widely distributed to and read by office workers in Downtown San Francisco during the years the print magazine was published from 1981 to 1994.

Publication history
Processed World began publication in April 1981 and was printed on an irregular basis, approximately quarterly to semi-annually until Winter 1992. There were 32 published printed issues.

There have subsequently been three more issues published on the Internet — number 33 in 1995, and two more issues, one in 2000 and one in 2005. These last two issues are numbered 2.001 and 2.005.  All of the issues of the magazine are now available online.

Themes
The magazine is about the absurdity and futility of modern employment practices in which a large number of college-educated people are often forced to seek temporary work with no employee benefits. The magazine details the subversive attitudes and sense of humor required for workers to be able to get through the day when forced to perform dull, degrading and boring work as wage slaves doing modern office work such as working as a computer programmer, word processor, call center operator, data entry operator, telemarketer or file clerk.

Contributors
Writers that have had work published by the magazine include founder Carlsson, Manning, Chris Winks, Denis Hayes, Greg Williamson, Jim Swanson, Fred Rinne, Adam Cornford, John Norton, Jesse Drew, and Donna Kossy and many more. The magazine featured cartoons by artists such as Tom Tomorrow, Melinda Gebbie, Ted Rall, Jay Kinney, and Paul Mavrides.

Many of the magazine's contributors, such as Dan Perkins, e.g. "Tom Tomorrow," adopted pseudonyms to avoid retribution from potential employers.

See also
 Anarchism
 Temporary work

Further reading
 
 
 
 
 Elias, Robert, "Tom Tomorrow. (the Progressive Interview)," The Progressive (March 2003).

References

External links
 Processed World at the Internet Archive: a complete run of the issues is available except for issue 33.

Quarterly magazines published in the United States
Anarchist periodicals published in the United States
Defunct political magazines published in the United States
Irregularly published magazines published in the United States
Magazines established in 1981
Magazines disestablished in 2005
Magazines published in San Francisco
Zines